Krisztián Nagy (born 28 July 1994) is a Hungarian professional ice hockey Forward who plays for MAC Budapest in the Erste Liga.

External links

1994 births
DVTK Jegesmedvék players
MAC Budapest players
Living people
Hungarian ice hockey forwards
Ice hockey people from Budapest
20th-century Hungarian people
21st-century Hungarian people